Lefter Maliqi has been a member of the Assembly of the Republic of Albania for the Democratic Party of Albania for the period 2009 - 2013.

References

Living people
Democratic Party of Albania politicians
Members of the Parliament of Albania
Year of birth missing (living people)
Place of birth missing (living people)
21st-century Albanian politicians